Artem Vitaliyovych Fedorov (born 18 September 1998) is a Ukrainian professional footballer who plays as a left winger for Petrocub Hîncești.

Career
Fedorov played youth football at the local sports school in Bilhorod-Dnistrovskyi, before starting his senior career with Tyras-2500 Bilhorod-Dnistrovskyi in 2017. In 2019, he played for Lithuanian side Pakruojis and between 2020 and 2021 he played for Moldovan side Dinamo-Auto Tiraspol. In September 2021, he signed a three-year contract with another Moldovan club, Petrocub Hîncești.

References

External links

 
 

1998 births
Living people
Association football wingers
Ukrainian footballers
Ukrainian expatriate footballers
FC Tyras-2500 Bilhorod-Dnistrovskyi players
FC Pakruojis players
FC Dinamo-Auto Tiraspol players
CS Petrocub Hîncești players
I Lyga players
Moldovan Super Liga players
Ukrainian expatriate sportspeople in Lithuania
Expatriate footballers in Lithuania
Ukrainian expatriate sportspeople in Moldova
Expatriate footballers in Moldova